Mary Brown's Chicken, also known as Mary Brown's, is a Canadian fast food restaurant with approximately 200 locations across Canada. The chain specializes in fried chicken or fried plant-based chicken dinners.

History
In 1969, Pat Tarrant and Cyril Fleming purchased rights to open up the first Canadian Golden Skillet fried chicken franchise (originally from Richmond, Virginia) in Newfoundland. The first location was located in St. John's Avalon Mall, however, Tarrant and Fleming were forced to rename the establishment due to legal reasons. It was eventually named Mary Brown's Virginia Fried Chicken, after Mary Brown Guthrie (1909–1955), the wife of Golden Skillet owner and founder Clifton W. Guthrie. According to the company, Mary Brown, who was from Petersburg, Virginia, was the creator of the chain's proprietary recipe for American Southern-fried chicken, which was sold to Tarrant and Fleming in 1969.

By 1972, Mary Brown's had grown beyond Newfoundland, opening locations in Oshawa and Mississauga in the Greater Toronto Area. From there, the chain expanded west to Alberta, throughout the remaining Atlantic Provinces, then to Manitoba and Saskatchewan. More recently, Mary Brown's has opened several locations in British Columbia, and a store in Yellowknife, Northwest Territories. The brand continues to grow across Canada.

Franchises and corporate stores 
Mary Brown's has about 20 corporate stores. The balance of its stores, about 180, are franchised and located throughout Canada.

Mary Brown's has been a member of the Canadian Franchise Association for over 35 years.  They have been awarded the Canadian Franchisees’ Choice Award 9 years consecutively. In 2019, 2020, and 2021, Mary Brown's was named one of the Best Managed Companies in Canada by Deloitte Canada.

Mary Brown's currently operates approximately 200 stores nationally.

Management
The owner and CEO of Mary Brown's is Gregory Roberts of PI Enterprises Group, an entrepreneur and chartered accountant from Triton, Newfoundland and Labrador. Roberts acquired the brand in 2007 and since that time, has grown the chain from about 67 stores to its current count of approximately 200 stores.

The president and COO of Mary Brown's is Hadi Chahin, a 20-year plus executive of the food services industry. Prior to joining Mary Brown's, Chahin was the vice president of operations for Chartwells, a division of Compass Group Canada. He also held leadership roles with Sodexo Canada, Prime Restaurants and White Lodging Services.

Marketing 
Mary Brown's uses the slogans "Made Fresh from Scratch" and "100% Canadian" in their materials. "Crave Delicious" has become the brand's overriding tagline since mid-2019.

"Made Fresh from Scratch" is a reflection of the brand's preparation methods, focusing on fresh rather than frozen chicken. Mary Brown's use the word "handcrafted" to express how they prepare their food.

"Truly Canadian" was adopted as a slogan in 2017 to reflect the brand's heritage as a Newfoundland-founded, Canadian-owned business. Company materials note that the company is family-owned and operated by Canadians, and sells Canada Grade A chicken raised by Canadian farmers.

Mary Brown's original logo was developed in the 1970s and updated in 2000. In late 2017, the logo underwent a refresh as part of a more complete rebranding.

In April 2020, in the midst of the COVID-19 pandemic, Mary Brown's sponsored the temporary removal of all paywalls from Postmedia Network newspaper websites for the month.

In October 2021, Mary Brown’s acquired the naming rights to the Mile One Centre in St. John's, in a 10-year deal worth 1.5 million dollars. These changes took effect on November 5, 2021.

See also
 List of Canadian restaurant chains
 List of fast-food chains in Canada
 List of fast-food chicken restaurants

References

Fast-food poultry restaurants
Restaurants in Newfoundland and Labrador
Fast-food chains of Canada
Fast-food franchises
Restaurants in Ontario
Restaurants established in 1969
1969 establishments in Newfoundland and Labrador
Companies based in Markham, Ontario